Lia van Schie (born 8 July 1970) is a retired speed skater from the Netherlands who was active between 1989 and 1995. She competed at the 1992 Winter Olympics in the 1500, 3000 and 5000 m and finished in 16th, 9th and 8th place, respectively. She won a bronze medal at the World All-Round Speed Skating Championships for Women in 1991.

Results

Personal bests: 
500 m – 42.51 (1991)
 1000 m – 1:23.4 (1991)
 1500 m – 2:06.27 (1990)
 3000 m – 4:24.11 (1992)
 5000 m – 7:29.35 (1992)

References

1970 births
Living people
Dutch female speed skaters
Olympic speed skaters of the Netherlands
Speed skaters at the 1992 Winter Olympics
Sportspeople from Leiden
World Allround Speed Skating Championships medalists
21st-century Dutch women
20th-century Dutch women